Moturoa AFC is one of New Zealand's oldest association football clubs. Based in New Plymouth, the club traces its establishment back to the Watersiders Association Football Club of New Plymouth.  

Moturoa AFC has rich history with the club having success in many regional and national competitions.

Its clubrooms and home ground are at the Onuku Taipari Domain, Ngāmotu Road, Spotswood.

Moturoa have competed for the Chatham Cup since 1949, reaching the North Island semi-final in 1954 against Stop Out at Western Park, and again in 1959 against Miramar Rangers at the Basin Reserve. In 1960 the club reached the North Island final of the cup facing North Shore United at Blandford Park, and again in 1962 facing Hamilton Technical Old Boys at Seddon Park. In 1966 Moturoa again reached the NI semi-final to face Miramar Rangers, but on this occasion at Western Park. Moturoa reached the fifth round of the Chatham Cup in the 1969, 1971 and 1972 seasons, with the 1972 competition notable for knocking out the holders of the trophy Western Suburbs in the fourth round. The club has since reached the fourth round in 1974, 1987, 2000 and 2002 and last competed in the competition in 2016

Early history
Originally the Moturoa Football Club was a short-lived rugby club, started by the Breakwater Sports Committee in the kiosk at Ngāmotu Beach in early 1914, before amalgamating with the Star club. Moturoa FC's home ground was the prison reserve field adjacent to Otaka Street in Moturoa. The club retained one junior team for a short period after the amalgamation that played in the Moturoa club's colour white, with the addition of a star emblem on the shirt chest.

From 1915 to 1921 there was no official Taranaki Association Football Championship due to the war. The New Plymouth club relied on friendly games against mariners of the trade shipping at the port of Moturoa.

The first ever recorded Moturoa association football team was published in the Taranaki Daily News on 25 May 1925, with players; Thompson, Matthews, Randell, the Spedding brothers, the Anderson brothers, Murray, Mells, Peere, Towes and Cole scheduled to face Fitzroy at the Tukapa Ground in Westown.

There was an annual meeting of the New Plymouth Association Football Club in mid-May 1926 where it was decided that the Moturoa and New Plymouth Clubs' combine for the purpose of entering a team for the Julian Cup.

At a meeting of the Northern sub-division of the football association executive on 4 July 1927, the recently donated trophy by Duff & Co. to the Watersiders club was discussed. As the four teams entered were not affiliated to the NZFA an approach was made to the Taranaki Football Association asking permission to run the competition.

In the final match of the inaugural Duff Rose Bowl at Western Park in 1927 the Watersiders beat the Fitzroy-based Rangers club with Ted Spedding scoring twice. The winning team also included; goalkeeper Tom Broughton, H. Lewis, W. Davis, I. Thompson, R. Murray, R. Hughes, Anderson, Young, Wylie, J. Spedding, and reserves Karim, White and McCullough.

The Watersiders Association Football Club committee met in March 1928 where a decision was made to change its name to the Moturoa Club. At the meeting the report detailing the 1927 season was presented. The Duff Rose Bowl was given to the Northern sub-division of the Taranaki Football Association for competition amongst local teams. The annual subscription was set at five shillings, colours of red shirts with white pants fixed and a squad of twenty players registered.

Moturoa first affiliated with the Taranaki Football Association for the 1928 season. Moturoa won the 1929 Chinese Cup. Moturoa's intermediate team, competing for the 1929 Plunket Cup, lost the final to Caledonian. Moturoa also won the Plumb Cup for the Taranaki junior championship.
Moturoa won the annual six-a-side competition for the Priest Shield at New Plymouth in 1931. There were six teams in the competition which was conducted at Western Park. The players in the final for Moturoa were: goal-keeper Roy Johns, R. and F. Roper, Anderson, White, Smith. And for Stratford: Grierson, Thompson, Henderson, O’Shannessey, McGrory, Elgar. The final score was Moturoa – 3 Stratford – 1. White getting a hat-trick for Moturoa.
The Moturoa School team won the Malayan Shield in 1934 with Mr. P. Gardner and Mr. E. Kenny as coaches, and D. Kendall as captain.

Moturoa Women's Football

The original Moturoa AFC women's team emerged in 1969 and began playing league football in 1975 after the foundation of the Taranaki Women's Football Association.

Moturoa won the B Division of the Taranaki Women's Football Association league in 1981 and 1992.

In 2010 the club won the Taranaki Women's Premiership for the first time.

Moturoa won the 2011 Central Federation Cup. The final, against the Hawkes Bays' Maycenvale United, was played at Memorial Park, Palmerston North.

In 2013 Moturoa won the treble with the Taranaki title, the Duchess Cup and the Federation Cup. Coached by former Moturoa player Campbell Waugh and captained by former New Zealand Universities and national age-group representative Chelsea Aim, the side was undefeated in 20 games, with the only dropped points a draw with Waitara in the Taranaki Women's League. 49 goals were scored and 6 conceded. The Federation Cup final at Turuturu Park in Hāwera was against an unbeaten and free-scoring Wanganui Athletic. Manawatu Top 4 champions, Athletic had hit the net in excess of 130 times during their season, and also qualified for the Central League play-offs. Moturoa took the match and the trophy 1–0, with a strong defensive effort and a late winner. InIn 2015 Moturoa entered the women's Central League competition organised by Capital Football and finished fifth in its first season.

The 2016 Central League season began with a new squad of players complemented by the signing of Fernanda Toscani from North Force.

The 2018 season saw Moturoa finish as runner-up to Massey University after joining the Central Women's Federation League.

In 2020 Moturoa won the Central Federation Women's Premier League.

In 2022 the Moturoa women's side won the Central Women's Federation Cup for the fourth time along with a treble of local Taranaki titles.

Honours

Men's 
Taranaki Championship - Julian Cup: 1956, 1959, 1960, 1961, 1962, 1963, 1964 (shared with Old Boys), 1965, 1969, 1971.
1965 represented Taranaki in the regional representative Central Districts League. 
1966 joined Western League. 
1967 joined Central Districts Premier League as founding member. 
1972 promoted to Western League
1973 promoted to Central League
Central League - 1973 Division Two Champions. 
1976 - 1985 Western Tasman League. (Taranaki United composite side retained Central League position)
1985 Western Tasman League Champions
Promotion to 1986 Central League. 1989 Division Two - 2nd (promoted). 1993 Division One - 2nd (promoted to Central Premier Division).

Taranaki Premiership - Ross Trophy: (First XI joined Taranaki Premiership in 1995) 1999, 2006, 2010, 2015, 2017, 2018, 2019
2000 promoted as one of ten founding clubs of the Central Federation League. (Federation League position given to Team Taranaki in 2004).
Duff Rose Bowl Champions: 1927, 1946, 1947, 1949, 1959, 1960, 1961, 1962, 1963, 1964, 1970, 1975, 1980, 1985, 2001, 2003, 2016, 2017 
Sheffield United F.C. Plate - 2019

Women's 
Taranaki Women's Football Association B Division Champions - 1981, 1992.
Taranaki Women's Premier League Champions - 2010, 2011, 2012, 2013, 2014, 2019, 2021, 2022
Taranaki Women's League Challenge Trophy Holders - 2010, 2011, 2012, 2013, 2014, 2015, 2016, 2018, 2019, 2021, 2022
Duchess Cup Champions - 2010, 2011, 2012, 2013, 2014, 2016, 2017, 2018, 2019, 2020, 2021, 2022
Central Women's Federation Cup Champions - 2011, 2013, 2019, 2022.
Central Federation Premier Women's League Champions - 2020.

See also
Moturoa AFC players

References

Association football clubs in New Zealand
Sport in New Plymouth